Festus Yeboah Asuamah is an Anglican bishop  in Ghana: he has been the Bishop of Sunyani since 2009.

References

Anglican bishops of Sunyani
21st-century Anglican bishops in Ghana
Year of birth missing (living people)
Living people